The Williamsburg Bridge is a suspension bridge in New York City across the East River connecting the Lower East Side of Manhattan at Delancey Street with the Williamsburg neighborhood of Brooklyn at Broadway near the Brooklyn-Queens Expressway (Interstate 278). Completed in 1903, it was the longest suspension bridge span in the world until 1924.

The bridge is one of four toll-free vehicular bridges connecting Manhattan Island and Long Island. The others are the Queensboro Bridge to the north, and the Manhattan and Brooklyn Bridges to the south. The Williamsburg Bridge once carried New York State Route 27A and was planned to carry Interstate 78, though the planned I-78 designation was aborted by the cancellation of the Lower Manhattan Expressway and Bushwick Expressway.

History

Construction 

Construction on what was then known as the "East River Bridge", the second to span it, began in 1896 after approval by the Governor of New York on May 27, 1895. The new bridge was to be built north of the Grand Street Ferry, terminating at Delancey and Clinton Streets on the Manhattan side and at South Fifth Street and Driggs Avenue on the Brooklyn side. Leffert L. Buck was the chief engineer, Henry Hornbostel was the architect, and Holton D. Robinson was the assistant engineer.

Engineers first constructed caissons on either side to support the future bridge. The caisson on the Manhattan side was completed in May 1897, upon which time the caisson on the Brooklyn side was launched. The caissons were manufactured in a shipyard in Williamsburg. In January 1898, Mayor Robert Anderson Van Wyck removed the members of the East River Bridge Commission due to "charges of extravagance". A commission of six people appointed by the state was proposed, but the bill was rejected.

As part of the Williamsburg Bridge's construction, the section of Delancey Street between the bridge's western end and the Bowery was widened. The portion of Spring Street between the Bowery and Lafayette Street was also expanded. This was the third plan for the bridge's western approaches that was publicly announced. Public opposition had caused the cancellation of previous proposals, which included a wide street extending from the end of the bridge to either Cooper Square or the intersection of Houston Street and Second Avenue. To accommodate the bridge's approaches, 600 houses were demolished in total, including 330 on the Manhattan side and 270 on the Brooklyn side. More than 10,000 people were evicted from these houses during construction.

The bridge's supporting wires were manufactured by the Roebling Company in Trenton, New Jersey and ready to be installed by February 1901. The first temporary wires between the East River Bridge's two towers were strung on April 9, 1901. They were to be replaced later with permanent  main cables made up of 7,696 smaller cables twisted together. The pair were fully strung by April 16, and work on the bridge's pedestrian deck begun soon afterward. The pedestrian path on the East River Bridge was completed in June 1901. Afterward, construction progressed at a fast pace, owing to the ease of manufacturing the steel. Ornamental lights were also placed on the bridge. The East River Bridge was renamed the "Williamsburg Bridge", after its Brooklyn terminus, in 1902.

There were several deaths during construction, including a worker who fell from the Manhattan approach in May 1900; the main steelwork engineer, who fell from the Brooklyn approach in September 1900; and a foreman who drowned in March 1902. Additionally, a fire occurred on the Brooklyn side's tower in November 1902, which nearly severed the bridge's cables.

The bridge opened on December 20, 1903, at a cost of $24.2 million ($624 million in 2016). At the time it was the longest suspension bridge span in the world, and remained so until the opening of the Bear Mountain Bridge in 1924.

20th century 
Originally, the Williamsburg Bridge was used mainly by trolley lines and railways (see ). In January 1932, it was agreed to convert a pair of abandoned trolley tracks on the south side of the bridge that had been deemed unsafe to an  roadway. Three more concrete roadways were added in 1941 as part of a Works Progress Administration project.

Rehabilitation 
Decades of deferred maintenance caused the Williamsburg Bridge to deteriorate significantly. This was worsened by a design flaw during construction: instead of galvanizing the main cables to prevent their corrosion, workers placed a mixture of "slushing oil" as a cost-saving measure. By 1912, some of the smaller cables in the bridge's anchorages had already snapped. In 1922, a galvanized sheath was placed around each of the main cables. However, damage still occurred, and in 1934, water in the main cables caused the wires to rust. In 1944 and again in 1963, workers poured oil treatments onto the cables in attempts to prevent the corrosion. Workers later added several support towers on either side of the main span to supplement the suspension towers. In 1969, inspectors found varying degrees of corrosion under the bridge's outer roadways. A 1978 study of the Williamsburg Bridge, as well as of five other bridges in New York City, found that there were varying degrees of corrosion on the main cables' individual strands. Cracks were also found in the bridge structure itself. Out of the six bridges examined in 1978, the Williamsburg Bridge was the only crossing that was found to have corroded suspension cables.

A subsequent study concluded that the bridge needed either new cables or a replacement. It was decided to replace the cables because that cost less than a wholesale replacement. However, engineers also considered the option of replacing the bridge if the cable replacement project became too expensive. The cable replacement was also complex, since the process had to occur while the bridge was still in operation.

The bridge continued to decay: in May 1987, two support bars fell from the outer roadway. By January 1988, it was determined that the four main suspension cables were only two-thirds as strong as they were supposed to be. Without any maintenance, the main cables would only be able to hold up the span until 1995. The New York State Department of Transportation applied for funding to rebuild the bridge, which was projected to cost $250 million and take ten years. Every third rope in the suspension had already been replaced in 1985. However, more than 200 cables in the suspension had snapped, and pieces of concrete were falling from the bridge. The bridge's structural integrity was rated as 1.6 out of a scale of 1 to 7.

Inspectors were appointed to monitor the bridge's status and make temporary bridge closures based on the amount of stress placed on the bridge. The bridge was closed to motor vehicle traffic and subway trains on April 11, 1988, after a painter noticed a large hole in a girder; upon further review, inspectors also discovered severe corrosion in a floor beam. An inspection in May 1988 found 290 "flag conditions" where the steelwork of the bridge could malfunction, potentially causing the bridge to collapse. Most of these "flags" were limited to the approaches, but one flag condition was found in the elevated subway structure within the suspension span. The Williamsburg Bridge was partially reopened at the end of May, in time for the Memorial Day holiday. Mayor Ed Koch decided that it would cost less to rebuild the bridge than to replace it. To alleviate the loads on the bridge, it was reopened in three phases: first to cars, then to subways, and finally to trucks.

The bridge was rebuilt through much of the 1990s and 2000s. The cast iron stairway on the Manhattan side, and the steep ramp from Driggs Avenue on the Williamsburg side, were replaced to allow handicapped access per the Americans with Disabilities Act of 1990. A decrepit walkway on the Williamsburg Bridge was closed in June 1991, and it reopened as a bike path in March 1992. Since the new bike path opened, the bridge has become the most heavily bicycled span in North America. Cable replacement started in April 1992. The subway tracks along the bridge were closed in April 1999 to allow the reconstruction of the subway structure. The tracks reopened in September of that year. Also in 1999, Gandhi Engineering designed and rebuilt the other pedestrian pathway along the Williamsburg Bridge. The final two vehicular lanes on the renovated span were reopened in 2002.

21st century 

A celebration was held on June 22, 2003, to mark the bridge's 100th anniversary.  The area surrounding Continental Army Plaza was filled with musical performers, history exhibits, and street vendors. Dignitaries marched across the bridge carrying the 45-star American flag used in a game of capture the flag played by workers after the placement of the final cable in June 1902. A truck-sized birthday cake was specially made for the event by Domino Sugar, which had a factory on the East River waterfront near the bridge. The ornamental lights on the bridge were re-lighted in November of that year after being turned off for eight months due to a lack of funds.

The bridge was designated as a National Historic Civil Engineering Landmark by the American Society of Civil Engineers in 2009.

In 2016, a local resident launched a campaign to rename the bridge for jazz musician Sonny Rollins, who practiced on the bridge almost every day from 1959 to 1961, while he was living on the Lower East Side of Manhattan. His 1962 album The Bridge, produced on his return from his 3-year sabbatical, was named in its honor.

In 2017, it was announced that between April 2019 and June 2020, during the 14th Street Tunnel shutdown, traffic restrictions would be implemented on the Williamsburg Bridge during the daytime. The restrictions would take place seven days a week between 5 a.m. and 10 pm. The bridge would be restricted to buses, trucks, and vehicles with more than 3 passengers during these times. The peak-hour high-occupancy vehicle restriction would allow the Williamsburg Bridge to accommodate three Select Bus Service bus rapid transit routes between Brooklyn and Manhattan. It was projected that during the shutdown, 70 buses in each direction would travel across the Williamsburg Bridge every hour. This was later revised upward to 80 buses per hour. However, in January 2019, it was announced that the 14th Street Tunnel would not completely shut down. As a result, New York City Transit Authority head Andy Byford stated that the Williamsburg Bridge's HOV lanes were no longer needed.

The New York City Department of Transportation (NYCDOT) contracted Skanska to renovate the bridge in November 2022. The project, budgeted at $167 million, was partially funded by the Infrastructure Investment and Jobs Act. Work began in late 2022 and is expected to be complete in 2025.

Description 
The structure is unconventional among suspension bridges in having its main span hanging from cables in the usual manner but its side spans being supported entirely by their trusswork.

The Brooklyn landing is between Grand Street and Broadway, which both had ferries prior to the bridge's construction. The five ferry routes operated from the landings went out of business by 1908.

The bridge once carried New York State Route 27A. Had the Lower Manhattan Expressway been built, the Williamsburg Bridge would have been designated Interstate 78.

In reference to the area's large Yiddish-speaking population, a sign on the westbound approach to the bridge reads, "Leaving Brooklyn: Oy Vey!" Another sign says "Leaving Brooklyn, Fuhgeddaboudit!" The two signs were proposed by former Brooklyn borough president Marty Markowitz in the early 2000s.

Rail tracks 
The Williamsburg and Manhattan bridges are the only suspension bridges in New York City that still carry both automobile and rail traffic. The Williamsburg once held four trolley tracks in addition to the two subway tracks currently on the bridge that connect the New York City Subway's BMT Nassau Street Line and BMT Jamaica Line.

Two tracks on the south side carried streetcars from the Brooklyn side:
 Williamsburg Bridge Local, 1904–1948
 Nostrand Avenue Line, 1904–1923 and 1931–1948
 Ralph Avenue Line, 1905–1908; Ralph and Rockaway Avenues Line, 1908–1923 and 1931–1948
 Tompkins Avenue Line, 1906–1923 and 1931–1947
 Reid Avenue Line, 1904–1923 and 1931–1937
 Broadway Line, 1904–1923
 Franklin Avenue Line, 1904–1923
 Grand Street Line, 1904–1923
 Sumner Avenue Line, 1904–1923
 Wilson Avenue Line, 1904–1923
 Bushwick Avenue Line, 1904–1921
 Nostrand-Culver Line and Nostrand-Prospect Line, 1906–1919

Two north-side tracks carried Manhattan streetcars:
 Grand Street Line, 1904–1932
 Post Office Line, 1919–1932
 Seventh Avenue-Brooklyn Line, 1911–1919
 8th Street Crosstown Line, 1904–1911
 14th Street-Williamsburg Bridge Line, 1904–1911
 Fourth Avenue and Williamsburg Bridge Line, 1904–1911

The rapid transit tracks in the center of the bridge were initially used by the Brooklyn Rapid Transit Company (BRT) elevated railroad.  Today, the New York City Subway's , successors to the BRT/BMT lines, use these tracks at the following times:

In 1995, a collision between a J train and an M train occurred on the bridge tracks, killing the J train's motorman. The crash led to widespread changes in the subway's signaling system.

Pedestrian and bicycle paths
From the Manhattan end the pathway begins in the median of Delancey Street at Clinton Street. On the western third of the bridge the pathway is shared by bicycles and pedestrians. This section of the path runs directly above the subway tracks. On the remaining two thirds of the bridge the pathway splits with the bicycle pathway running on the north side and the pedestrian path on the south side. The bicycle pathway ends on South 5th Street at Continental Army Plaza. The pedestrian pathway ends at Bedford Avenue.

Plazas

At the foot of the bridge in Williamsburg between South 5th place and Havemeyer Street in Brooklyn are three public areas that, collectively, comprise the Williamsburg Bridge Plaza, also known as Washington Plaza or George Washington Monument Park. It contains Continental Army Plaza and LaGuardia Playground, both operated by the Parks Department, as well as the Williamsburg Bridge Plaza Bus Terminal, which serves numerous bus lines to Brooklyn and Queens. The plaza is named after the large statue of George Washington in Continental Army Plaza erected in 1906.

In popular culture 
 The 1928 Edward Hopper painting From Williamsburg Bridge depicts a building as seen from the bridge's walkway. The building has since been demolished, and the walkway has been reconstructed.
 The bridge appears in both The Crew and its 2018 sequel as a driveable bridge.
 The Williamsburg Bridge appears in the films Fighting Death (1914); a lost film, City for Conquest (1940), A Tree Grows in Brooklyn (1945), The Naked City (1948), The French Connection (1971), Serpico and Live and Let Die (both 1973), Once Upon a Time in America (1984), Johnny Suede (1991), Scent of a Woman (1992), American Gangster (2007), The Siege (1998), Léon (1994), The Naked Brothers Band: The Movie (2005), and The Dark Knight Rises and The Amazing Spider-Man (both 2012).
 The bridge is mentioned several times in the novel A Tree Grows in Brooklyn (1943) by Betty Smith. It is also referenced in the novels The Alienist (1994) by Caleb Carr and City of Bones, the first book of The Mortal Instruments. A scene in the book The Last Olympian takes place on the bridge.
 It is mentioned in several songs as well. East Bay rockers Black Cat Music have a song titled "Williamsburg Bridge Song". The song "True Dreams of Wichita", by Soul Coughing, includes the lyric "And you can stand on the arms of the Williamsburg Bridge crying 'Hey man, well this is Babylon'" The area by the bridge was the location for Depeche Mode's 1990 single "Policy Of Truth". It was also used as cover art for their following song "World in My Eyes". The Korean group BIGBANG filmed their "Bad Boy" music video on and around the bridge in 2012. Finally, Grammy-winning singer-songwriter Susan McKeown's 2012 album Belong opens with a duet with fellow Irish singer-songwriter Declan O'Rourke entitled "On The Bridge to Williamsburg".
 From 1959 to 1961, during a sabbatical from performing, American jazz saxophonist Sonny Rollins would go to the Williamsburg Bridge for practice sessions to spare a neighboring expectant mother the noise. His 1962 album The Bridge, produced on his return from retirement, was titled after the bridge.
 In 1996, artist Chris Doyle gilded the steps to the pedestrian walkway of the bridge.  The project, known as "Commutable", was sponsored by the Public Art Fund, and transformed the decrepit and dangerous stairway into a monument to the thousands of everyday bicycle and walking commuters.
 In Alex Scarrow's popular sci-fi series, the TimeRiders, an archway under the bridge has been featured.
 In N.K. Jemisin's novel, The City We Became, the bridge is destroyed by the giant tentacle of an inter-dimensional entity attacking New York.

See also

Lists of crossings of the East River
List of bridges and tunnels in New York City
List of bridges in the United States
List of longest suspension bridge spans

References

Bibliography

External links 

 Williamsburg Bridge info from NYCDOT
 
 
 nycroads.com
 NYCsubway.org – Williamsburg Bridge

1903 establishments in New York City
Articles containing video clips
Bike paths in New York City
Bridges completed in 1903
Bridges in Brooklyn
Bridges on the Interstate Highway System
Bridges over the East River
Brooklyn–Manhattan Transit Corporation
Grand Street (Manhattan)
Henry Hornbostel buildings
Historic American Engineering Record in New York City
Historic Civil Engineering Landmarks
Interstate 78
Metal bridges in the United States
Pedestrian bridges in New York City
Railroad bridges in New York City
Rapid transit bridges
Road bridges in New York City
Road-rail bridges in the United States
Suspension bridges in New York City
Truss bridges in the United States
Williamsburg, Brooklyn
Double-decker bridges